Banausos (Ancient Greek , plural , banausoi) is a pejorative applied to the class of manual laborers or artisans in Ancient Greece. The actual etymology of the words is unknown; they are not attested outside Attic-Ionic or before the 5th century BC. The epic heroes call their smiths  – dēmiourgoi.

Banausos (or rather  – banausikos) has also been adapted into English, as the rare word banausic, both as a term of abuse, and to represent Greek usage. According to Dagobert D. Runes' Dictionary of Philosophy, it means "vulgar and illiberal", particularly when referring to arts or occupations that "deform the body or the mind."  Its use in English is not found before 1845,  with the Victorian revival of classical learning.

One of the contributions of classical philology to the Kultur-movement in Wilhelmine and post-Wilhelmine Germany was the use of banausisch as an insult — along with the myths that the German Soul is essentially Greek, that the ancient Greeks were blond, and that the modern Greeks are not descended from them. Today in German Banause is used to mean an uncouth person indifferent to high culture, like English philistine.

Such ideas have been regularly challenged since World War II, but they were occasionally reflected in the English-speaking world of the time. For example, Edith Hamilton accepted them as the best scholarship of her school days. Again, a junior colleague of Sir Gilbert Murray permitted himself (in 1935) the following, which goes well beyond Greek usage:

The aim of a journalist may either be to enlarge the circulation of a paper or to give his readers a true and intelligent picture of the world; of a lawyer either to extend his practice or to help justice be done; of a business man either to grow rich or to play his part as a 'nurse' of the community.  These alternatives are not exclusive.  But where the former predominates, the amount of arete generated will be small, and journalists, lawyers and industrialists will be banausoi rather than men.

Bibliography
Chap II, "Opinions, Passions, and Interests", Republics, Ancient and Modern, Vol. I, Paul A. Rahe, University of North Carolina Press, Chapel Hill and London, 1992.
The People of Aristophanes, Victor Ehrenberg, New York, 1962. pp 113–146.
Greek Popular Morality in the Time of Plato and Aristotle, Kenneth J. Dover, Oxford, 1974. pp 39–41; 172–174.
"L'idée de travail dans la Grèce archaïque", André Aymard, Journal de psychologie 41, 1948. pp 29–45.
"Hiérarchie du travail et autarcie individuelle", André Aymard, Études d'histoire ancienne, Paris, 1967. pp 316–333.
"Work and Nature in Ancient Greece", Jean-Pierre Vernant, Myth and Thought among the Greeks, London, 1983. pp 248–270.

Commentary works
"Humanism in Politics and Economics", Greek Ideals and Modern Life, Sir R. W. Livingstone, Martin Classical Lectures, Vol. V, Harvard University Press, Cambridge, MA., 1935.

References

External links

Word frequency information for βάναυσος from the Perseus Digital Library at the Classics Department of Tufts University

Economy of ancient Greece
Social classes of ancient Athens